Reggie Perry (born September 23, 1970) is a former Canadian football wide receiver in the Canadian Football League (CFL). He played for the Baltimore Stallions. Perry played college football at Southern California (USC), where he was a quarterback.

References

1970 births
Living people
People from Denison, Texas
Players of American football from Texas
American football quarterbacks
Canadian football wide receivers
USC Trojans football players
Baltimore Stallions players